The Istanbul-Sofia Express is an international passenger train operating daily between Istanbul, Turkey and Sofia, Bulgaria. The train runs  from Halkalı station in Istanbul, west to Sofia Central Station in Sofia. The first train departed Halkalı station at 22:40 on 21 February 2017, carrying 22 passengers. The Istanbul-Sofia Express is the successor to the Balkan Express, which operated between Istanbul and Belgrade, Serbia until June 2013.

Overview

Train 493/81031 departs Sofia Central Station at 21:00 (EET) each day, while its counterpart, train 492/81032, departs Halkalı station at 22:40 (FET) each day. These two trains meet at Kapıkule, on the Turkish
/Bulgarian border, where customs and passport control takes place. During non-DST days, the train enters/leaves Further-eastern European Time (UTC+3) and leaves/enters Eastern European Time (UTC+2), setting the clock forwards/backwards by one hour after crossing the border. 

Between Istanbul and Dimitrovgrad the Istanbul-Sofia Express runs together with the Bosphorus Express (464/465). From Dimitrovgrad, the Bosphorus Express disconnects and heads north to Bucharest, Romania.

Route

The Istanbul-Sofia Express operates on routes owned by the Turkish State Railways (TCDD) and the Bulgarian State Railways (BDŽ).

TCDD Istanbul-Pythio railway, Halkalı to Pehlivanköy
TCDD/BDŽ Edirne cut-off, Pehlivanköy to Svilengrad
BDŽ Plovdiv-Svilengrad railway, Svilengrad to Plovdiv
BDŽ Sofia-Plovdiv railway, Plovdiv to Sofia

References

External links
TCDD Taşımacılık official website
BDZ official website

Named passenger trains of Turkey
Passenger rail transport in Bulgaria
International named passenger trains